Zağulba Bağları (also, Bağlar, Buzovnyneft’, Dacha Zagul’ba, Zagul’ba, and Zyugyul’ba) is a resort in Baku, Azerbaijan, and one of the main beaches. The city also hosts a disco club of the same name.

References

Populated places in Baku
Beaches of Azerbaijan